The 1955–56 season was Molde's 8th consecutive year in the second tier of Norwegian football, their fifth in Landsdelsserien.

This season, Molde competed in Landsdelsserien and the 1956 Norwegian Cup.

Season events
On 28 August 1955, Molde opened their new stadium with a 1–0 win against Aalesund. Arne Hemnes scored the first goal in the 34th minute of the game. Approximately 2,500 spectators attended the opening game at Molde Stadion.

Squad
Source:

Friendlies

Competitions

Landsdelsserien (Møre)

Results summary

Results

Table

Promotion play-offs

1956 Norwegian Cup

Season statistics

Appearances and goals
3 of 4 goals from Molde's Norwegian Cup second round game against Langevåg lacks information about goal scorer.  
Source:

|}

Goal scorers
3 of 4 goals from Molde's Norwegian Cup second round game against Langevåg lacks information about goal scorer.

See also
Molde FK seasons

References

1955 56